The Convention on International Civil Aviation, also known as the Chicago Convention, established the International Civil Aviation Organization (ICAO), a specialized agency of the United Nations charged with coordinating international air travel. The Convention establishes rules of airspace, aircraft registration and safety, security, and sustainability, and details the rights of the signatories in relation to air travel. The Convention also contains provisions pertaining to taxation.

The document was signed on December 7, 1944, in Chicago by 52 signatory states. It received the requisite 26th ratification on March 5, 1947, and went into effect on April 4, 1947, the same date that ICAO came into being. In October of the same year, ICAO became a specialized agency of the United Nations Economic and Social Council (ECOSOC). The Convention has since been revised eight times (in 1959, 1963, 1969, 1975, 1980, 1997, 2000 and 2006).

As of March 2019, the Chicago Convention had 193 state parties, which includes all member states of the United Nations except Liechtenstein. The Cook Islands is a party to the Convention although it is not a member of the UN. The convention has been extended to cover Liechtenstein by the ratification of Switzerland.

Main articles
Some important articles are:

Article 1: Every state has complete and exclusive sovereignty over airspace above its territory.

Article 3 bis: Every other state must refrain from resorting to the use of weapons against civil aircraft in flight.

Article 5:  The aircraft of states, other than scheduled international air services, have the right to make flights across state's territories and to make stops without obtaining prior permission. However, the state may require the aircraft to make a landing.

Article 6: (Scheduled air services) No scheduled international air service may be operated over or into the territory of a contracting State, except with the special permission or other authorization of that State.

Article 10: (Landing at customs airports): The state can require that landing to be at a designated customs airport and similarly departure from the territory can be required to be from a designated customs airport.

Article 12: Each state shall keep its own rules of the air as uniform as possible with those established under the convention, the duty to ensure compliance with these rules rests with the contracting state.

Article 13: (Entry and Clearance Regulations) A state's laws and regulations regarding the admission and departure of passengers, crew or cargo from aircraft shall be complied with on arrival, upon departure and whilst within the territory of that state.

Article 16: The authorities of each state shall have the right to search the aircraft of other states on landing or departure, without unreasonable delay.

Article 24: Aircraft on a flight to, from, or across the territory of another contracting State shall be admitted temporarily free of duty, subject to the customs regulations of the State. Fuel, lubricating oils, spare parts, regular equipment and aircraft stores on board an aircraft of a contracting State, on arrival in the territory of another contracting State and retained on board on leaving the territory of that State shall be exempt from customs duty, inspection fees or similar national or local duties and charges. This exemption shall not apply to any quantities or articles unloaded, except in accordance with the customs regulations of the State, which may require that they shall be kept under customs supervision.

Article 29: Before an international flight, the pilot in command must ensure that the aircraft is airworthy, duly registered and that the relevant certificates are on board the aircraft. The required documents are:
Certificate of registration
Certificate of airworthiness 
Passenger names, place of boarding and destination
Crew licenses
Journey Logbook
Radio Licence
Cargo manifest

Article 30: The aircraft of a state flying in or over the territory of another state shall only carry radios licensed and used in accordance with the regulations of the state in which the aircraft is registered. The radios may only be used by members of the flight crew suitably licensed by the state in which the aircraft is registered.

Article 32: The pilot and crew of every aircraft engaged in international aviation must have certificates of competency and licensees issued or validated by the state in which the aircraft is registered.

Article 33: (Recognition of Certificates and Licences) Certificates of airworthiness, certificates of competency and licensees issued or validated by the state in which the aircraft is registered, shall be recognized as valid by other states. The requirements for the issuing of those certificates or airworthiness, certificates of competency or licensees must be equal to or above the minimum standards established by the Convention.

Article 40: No aircraft or personnel with endorsed licenses or certificate will engage in international navigation except with the permission of the state or states whose territory is entered. Any license holder who does not satisfy international standard relating to that license or certificate shall have attached to or endorsed on that license information regarding the particulars in which he does not satisfy those standards.

Annexes 

The Convention is supported by nineteen annexes containing standards and recommended practices (SARPs). The annexes are amended regularly by ICAO and are as follows:

Annex 1 – Personnel Licensing
Licensing of flight crews, air traffic controllers & aircraft maintenance personnel. Including Chapter 6 containing medical standards.
Annex 2 – Rules of the Air
 Appendix 1 - Signals
 Appendix 2 - Interception of civil aircraft
Appendix 3 - Tables of cruising levels
Appendix 4 - Unmanned free balloons
ATTACHMENT A. Interception of civil aircraft
ATTACHMENT B. Unlawful interference
Annex 3 – Meteorological Service for International Air Navigation
Vol I – Core SARPs
Vol II – Appendices and Attachments
Annex 4 – Aeronautical Charts
Annex 5 – Units of Measurement to be used in Air and Ground Operations
Annex 6 – Operation of Aircraft
Part I – International Commercial Air Transport – Aeroplanes
Part II – International General Aviation – Aeroplanes
Part III – International Operations – Helicopters
Annex 7 – Aircraft Nationality and Registration Marks
Annex 8 – Airworthiness of Aircraft
Annex 9 – Facilitation
Annex 10 – Aeronautical Telecommunications
Vol I – Radio Navigation Aids
Vol II – Communication Procedures including those with PANS status
Vol III – Communication Systems
Part I – Digital Data Communication Systems
Part II – Voice Communication Systems
Vol IV – Surveillance Radar and Collision Avoidance Systems
Vol V – Aeronautical Radio Frequency Spectrum Utilization
Annex 11 – Air Traffic Services – Air Traffic Control Service, Flight Information Service and Alerting Service
Annex 12 – Search and Rescue
Annex 13 – Aircraft Accident and Incident Investigation
Annex 14 – Aerodromes
Vol I – Aerodrome Design and Operations
Vol II – Heliports
Annex 15 – Aeronautical Information Services
Annex 16 – Environmental Protection
Vol I – Aircraft Noise
Vol II – Aircraft Engine Emissions
Vol III – CO2 Certification Requirement
Vol IV – Carbon Offsetting and Reduction Scheme for International Aviation (CORSIA)
Annex 17 – Security: Safeguarding International Civil Aviation Against Acts of Unlawful Interference
Annex 18 – The Safe Transport of Dangerous Goods by Air
Annex 19 – Safety Management (Since 14 November 2013)
Annex 5, Units of Measurement to be Used in Air and Ground Operations, named in its Table 3-3 three "non-SI alternative units permitted for temporary use with the SI": the foot (for vertical distance = altitude), the knot (for speed), and the nautical mile (for long distance).

Kerosene tax 

Article 24 of the Chicago Convention stipulates that when flying from one contracting state to another, the kerosene that is already on board aircraft may not be taxed by the state where the aircraft lands, nor by a state through whose airspace the aircraft has flown. This was intended prevent double taxation. However, there is no tax regulation in the Chicago Convention to refuelling the aircraft before departure. 

The Chicago Convention does not preclude a kerosene tax on domestic flights and on refueling before international flights. Although the ICAO has produced various policy documents suggesting that no taxes of any kind should be placed on aviation fuel, none of these are legally binding, and they are not found in the Chicago Convention itself. 

Although there are numerous bilateral agreements, so-called 'air services agreements', which make more extensive agreements, including often tax exemption when refueling an aircraft that has come from another contracting state, these are independent from the Chicago Convention; moreover, some air services agreements do allow for the taxation of fuels.

See also

 International Civil Aviation Day

Notes

References

Bibliography 
Paul Michael Krämer, Chicago Convention, 50th Anniversary Conference, Chicago, October 31 – November 1, 1994. Zeitschrift für Luft und Weltraumrecht 1995, S. 57.

External links
Convention on International Civil Aviation (9th edition), International Civil Aviation Organization, 2006
Annexes 1 to 18 - Convention on International Civil Aviation, International Civil Aviation Organization, 2007
The Postal History of ICAO : The Chicago Convention

1944 in aviation

Aviation law
Treaties concluded in 1944
Treaties entered into force in 1947
1944 in Illinois
Treaties of the Kingdom of Afghanistan
Treaties of Albania
Treaties of Algeria
Treaties of Andorra
Treaties of the People's Republic of Angola
Treaties of Antigua and Barbuda
Treaties of Argentina
Treaties of Armenia
Treaties of Australia
Treaties of Austria
Treaties of Azerbaijan
Treaties of the Bahamas
Treaties of Bahrain
Treaties of Bangladesh
Treaties of Barbados
Treaties of Belarus
Treaties of Belgium
Treaties of Belize
Treaties of the Republic of Dahomey
Treaties of Bhutan
Treaties of Bolivia
Treaties of Bosnia and Herzegovina
Treaties of Botswana
Treaties of the Second Brazilian Republic
Treaties of Brunei
Treaties of the People's Republic of Bulgaria
Treaties of Burkina Faso
Treaties of Burundi
Treaties of the Kingdom of Cambodia (1953–1970)
Treaties of Cameroon
Treaties of Canada
Treaties of Cape Verde
Treaties of the Central African Republic
Treaties of Chad
Treaties of Chile
Treaties of the Republic of China (1912–1949)
Treaties of Colombia
Treaties of the Comoros
Treaties of the Republic of the Congo
Treaties of the Cook Islands
Treaties of Costa Rica
Treaties of Ivory Coast
Treaties of Croatia
Treaties of Cuba
Treaties of Cyprus
Treaties of Czechoslovakia
Treaties of the Czech Republic
Treaties of North Korea
Treaties of the Republic of the Congo (Léopoldville)
Treaties of Denmark
Treaties of Djibouti
Treaties of the Dominican Republic
Treaties of Ecuador
Treaties of the Kingdom of Egypt
Treaties of El Salvador
Treaties of Equatorial Guinea
Treaties of Eritrea
Treaties of Estonia
Treaties of the Ethiopian Empire
Treaties of Fiji
Treaties of Finland
Treaties of the French Fourth Republic
Treaties of Gabon
Treaties of the Gambia
Treaties of Georgia (country)
Treaties of West Germany
Treaties of East Germany
Treaties of Ghana
Treaties of the Kingdom of Greece
Treaties of Grenada
Treaties of Guatemala
Treaties of Guinea
Treaties of Guinea-Bissau
Treaties of Guyana
Treaties of Haiti
Treaties of Honduras
Treaties of the Hungarian People's Republic
Treaties of Iceland
Treaties of India
Treaties of Indonesia
Treaties of Pahlavi Iran
Treaties of the Kingdom of Iraq
Treaties of Ireland
Treaties of Israel
Treaties of Italy
Treaties of Jamaica
Treaties of Japan
Treaties of Jordan
Treaties of Kazakhstan
Treaties of Kenya
Treaties of Kiribati
Treaties of Kuwait
Treaties of Kyrgyzstan
Treaties of the Kingdom of Laos
Treaties of Latvia
Treaties of Lebanon
Treaties of Lesotho
Treaties of Liberia
Treaties of the Kingdom of Libya
Treaties of Lithuania
Treaties of Luxembourg
Treaties of Madagascar
Treaties of Malawi
Treaties of the Federation of Malaya
Treaties of the Maldives
Treaties of Mali
Treaties of Malta
Treaties of the Marshall Islands
Treaties of Mauritania
Treaties of Mauritius
Treaties of Mexico
Treaties of the Federated States of Micronesia
Treaties of Monaco
Treaties of the Mongolian People's Republic
Treaties of Montenegro
Treaties of Morocco
Treaties of the People's Republic of Mozambique
Treaties of Myanmar
Treaties of Namibia
Treaties of Nauru
Treaties of Nepal
Treaties of the Netherlands
Treaties of New Zealand
Treaties of Nicaragua
Treaties of Niger
Treaties of Nigeria
Treaties of Norway
Treaties of Oman
Treaties of the Dominion of Pakistan
Treaties of Palau
Treaties of Panama
Treaties of Papua New Guinea
Treaties of Paraguay
Treaties of Peru
Treaties of the Philippines
Treaties of the Polish People's Republic
Treaties of the Estado Novo (Portugal)
Treaties of Qatar
Treaties of South Korea
Treaties of Moldova
Treaties of the Socialist Republic of Romania
Treaties of the Soviet Union
Treaties of Rwanda
Treaties of Samoa
Treaties of San Marino
Treaties of São Tomé and Príncipe
Treaties of Saudi Arabia
Treaties of Senegal
Treaties of Serbia and Montenegro
Treaties of Seychelles
Treaties of Sierra Leone
Treaties of Singapore
Treaties of Slovakia
Treaties of Slovenia
Treaties of the Solomon Islands
Treaties of the Somali Republic
Treaties of the Union of South Africa
Treaties of South Sudan
Treaties of Francoist Spain
Treaties of the Dominion of Ceylon
Treaties of Saint Kitts and Nevis
Treaties of Saint Lucia
Treaties of Saint Vincent and the Grenadines
Treaties of the Republic of the Sudan (1956–1969)
Treaties of Suriname
Treaties of Eswatini
Treaties of Sweden
Treaties of Switzerland
Treaties of the Syrian Republic (1930–1963)
Treaties of Tajikistan
Treaties of Thailand
Treaties of North Macedonia
Treaties of East Timor
Treaties of Togo
Treaties of Tonga
Treaties of Trinidad and Tobago
Treaties of Tunisia
Treaties of Turkey
Treaties of Turkmenistan
Treaties of Uganda
Treaties of Ukraine
Treaties of the United Arab Emirates
Treaties of the United Kingdom
Treaties of Tanganyika
Treaties of the United States
Treaties of Uruguay
Treaties of Uzbekistan
Treaties of Vanuatu
Treaties of Venezuela
Treaties of Vietnam
Treaties of the Yemen Arab Republic
Treaties of South Yemen
Treaties of Yugoslavia
Treaties of Zambia
Treaties of Zimbabwe
Treaties establishing intergovernmental organizations
Treaties extended to Curaçao and Dependencies
Treaties extended to Greenland
Treaties extended to the Faroe Islands
Treaties extended to British Hong Kong
Treaties extended to Portuguese Macau
History of Chicago
Treaties extended to Liechtenstein
Treaties of Tuvalu